The  is a kofun burial mound located in the city of Gyōda, Saitama Prefecture, in the Kantō region of Japan. The tumulus was designated a National Historic Site in 1938 and re-designated as a Special National Historic Site of Japan in 2020 as part of the Sakitama Kofun Cluster.

Overview
The Maruhakayama Kofun is a circular-type kofun with a diameter of 105 meters and height of 18.9 meters, and is thus one of the largest circular tumuli in Japan. Archaeological excavations have not been conducted and details of the burial chamber are unknown. The surface of the tumulus appears to have been covered only in fukiishi, with no haniwa shards having been discovered, and from this it is estimated that the tumulus was built in the early 6th century AD. From 1985 to 1986, maintenance work was conducted on the top and east side of the mound, and on a portion of the moat.

In 1590, during Toyotomi Hideyoshi's campaign against the Odawara Hōjō, Ishida Mitsunari established his field headquarters on top of this tumulus, constructing a semi-circular embankment as part of the Siege of Oshi Castle, which is just visible from the top of the mound.

See also
List of Historic Sites of Japan (Saitama)

References

External links

Gyoda city home page 
Museum of the Sakitama Ancient Burial Mounds 

Kofun
Archaeological sites in Japan
History of Saitama Prefecture
Gyōda
Historic Sites of Japan